John Harvie Picken (born March 1888, Melbourne, Australia) was a prominent Australian businessman and member of the Picken family.

Biography
Picken lived in Toorak, Victoria, Australia.

Family life
Harvie had two children, James Douglas and Donalda Mairi.  James Douglas Picken had two sons, Ian Douglas and Kenneth John.

Other information
Life member of Mercantile Rowing Club
Member of Kingston Heath Golf Club
Member of the West Brighton Club – where a trophy named the Menzies Picken trophy is co-named with his friend Robert Menzies (former Prime Minister of Australia).
Committee member of the VATC (today the Melbourne Racing Club) – where a race was named after him the "$22,000 Harvie Picken Super Vobis Handicap 3YO RB 0–72 1200M"
President of the Australian Chamber of Manufacturers 1953–54 (today the AusIndustry Group.
Practising Freemason – Naval and Military Club Melbourne 
Major supporter of the Australian National Gallery in St Kilda Road Melbourne

See also
Amcor Limited
J.T. Picken

References

Books
 E.K. Sinclair, "The Spreading Tree, A history of APM and Amcor 1844–1989", Allen and Unwin, 1990

External links
 Amcor.com 

1888 births
Australian philanthropists
Australian people of Scottish descent
Businesspeople from Melbourne
Year of death missing